is a Japanese television detective series that first aired on TV Asahi on June 3, 2000. It has been adapted into six films: AIBOU: The Movie (2008), AIBOU: CSI Files (2009),  AIBOU: The Movie II (2010), AIBOU: X-DAY (2013), AIBOU: The Movie III (2014) and AIBOU: The Movie IV (2017).

In Season 15 Episode 3, Roland appears as a host.

AIBOU is also broadcast with English subtitles in Hawaii by the television station KIKU under the name Partners, and in Los Angeles by the station Japan Hollywood Network (before UTB 18.1) under the official English name AIBOU: Tokyo Detective Duo.

Seasons

Films
 "AIBOU: The Movie" (2008) directed by Seiji Izumi
 "AIBOU: The Movie II" (2010) directed by Seiji Izumi
 "AIBOU: The Movie III" (2014) directed by Seiji Izumi
 "AIBOU: The Movie IV" (2017) directed by Hajime Hashimoto

Spin-off series
 "AIBOU Series: Yonezawa Mamoru no Jikenbo" (2009) directed by Yasuharu Hasebe, It stars Seiji Rokkaku.

Cast
 Yutaka Mizutani as Ukyo Sugishita 
 Yasufumi Terawaki as Kaoru Kameyama
 Mitsuhiro Oikawa as Takeru Kanbe 
 Hiroki Narimiya as Toru Kai
 Takashi Sorimachi as Wataru Kaburagi
 Saya Takagi (Ikue Masudo) as Tamaki Miyabe 
 Anju Suzuki as Sachiko Tsukimoto 
 Yoko Moriguchi as Mari Koide 
 Sawa Suzuki as Michiko Kameyama née Okudera
 Sei Matobu as Etsuko Usui
 Kazuhisa Kawahara as Kenichi Itami
 Atsushi Yamanishi as Rokuro Kakuta
 Kōji Ishizaka as Mineaki Kai
 Ryosuke Otani as Shinsuke Miura
 Ittoku Kishibe as Koken Onoda
 Yosuke Asari as Toshio Aoki
 Yukie Nakama as Miyako Yashiro
 Yukiko Shinohara as Reon Izumo
 Ryo Ono as Teruo Nakazono
 Satoshi Jinbo as Haruki Okochi
 Takaaki Enoki as Yahiko Kusakabe
 Ryuji Katagiri as Kanji Uchimura
 Seiji Rokkaku as Mamoru Yonezawa
 Takashi Yamanaka as Keiji Serizawa

References

Video game
A Nintendo DS game called Aibou DS was published by Tecmo in March 5, 2009.

External links 

  
 Official video game website (Japanese)
 

2000 Japanese television series debuts
Japanese drama television series
TV Asahi television dramas
Detective television series
Television shows set in Tokyo
Works by Takeharu Sakurai
Tokyo Metropolitan Police Department in fiction
Japanese detective television drama series